The 2012 Gamba Osaka season is Gamba Osaka's 20th season in the J. League Division 1 and 26th overall in the Japanese top flight. It also includes the 2012 J. League Cup, 2012 Emperor's Cup, and the 2012 AFC Champions League.

Players

Competitions

J. League

League table

Matches

J. League Cup

Quarter-finals

Emperor's Cup

AFC Champions League

References

Gamba Osaka
Gamba Osaka seasons